Jacqueline Riedel  (born ) is a retired German female volleyball player. She was part of the Germany women's national volleyball team.

She participated in the 1994 FIVB Volleyball Women's World Championship. On club level she played with TV Creglingen.

Clubs
 TV Creglingen (1994)

References

1969 births
Living people
German women's volleyball players
Place of birth missing (living people)